Ben Tirran (896 m) is a mountain in the Grampian Mountains of Scotland. It lies in the vast Mounth area of the eastern Highlands in Angus, on the northern side of Glen Clova.

A rounded peak, Ben Tirran is the highest point of a wide plateau. A number of lochans lie below its summit. The nearest town is Kirriemuir to the south.

References

Mountains and hills of Angus, Scotland
Marilyns of Scotland
Corbetts